The Torneo de Copa Alfredo Lois was a Uruguayan football tournament organized by the Uruguayan Football Association in 1969.

It was created with the aim of awarding a qualifier to the first (and only valid) edition of the 1970 Copa Ganadores de Copa.

List of champions

Titles by club

1969 Torneo de Copa Alfredo Lois

Qualified teams
The following teams qualified for the competition.

Semifinals

Third place

Final

References

H
Recurring sporting events established in 1969